Grgo Kusić (1892 – 1918) was a Croat soldier in the Austro-Hungarian Army.

Known as the Gulliver of Dalmatia, the  native was a personal imperial guard to emperor Franz Joseph I of Austria in Vienna.

References

External links
 https://web.archive.org/web/20090427151034/http://www.afrv.ch/Page_18_infosaviez.htm 

1892 births
1918 deaths
Croatian Austro-Hungarians
Croatian military personnel in Austrian armies
19th-century Croatian military personnel
20th-century Croatian military personnel